Brooks Koepka (born May 3, 1990) is an American professional golfer who plays in the LIV Golf League. In October 2018, he became world number one in the Official World Golf Ranking for 47 weeks after winning the 2018 CJ Cup. He won the U.S. Open in 2017 and 2018, and the PGA Championship in 2018 and 2019, becoming the first golfer in history to hold back-to-back titles in two majors simultaneously.  He started his career on the European Challenge Tour and eventually the European Tour. He played college golf at Florida State University.

Koepka claimed his first major championship at the U.S. Open in 2017 at Erin Hills, Wisconsin. He successfully defended his title in 2018 at Shinnecock Hills on Long Island, the first golfer to win consecutive U.S. Opens since Curtis Strange in 1988 and 1989. He won his third major at the 2018 PGA Championship at Bellerive Country Club, shooting a major-championship-record-tying 264 over 72 holes. His 2018 victories in the U.S. Open and the PGA Championship were the first instance of that double since Tiger Woods in 2000. He won his fourth major at the 2019 PGA Championship at Bethpage Black.

Early years 
Born in West Palm Beach, Florida, Koepka was raised in Lake Worth, and attended Cardinal Newman High School in West Palm Beach.

Amateur career 
Koepka played college golf at Florida State University in Tallahassee, where he won three events and was a three-time All-American. He qualified for the 2012 U.S. Open as an amateur, but missed the cut by six strokes.

Professional career

2012–2013
In the summer of 2012, Koepka turned professional and began playing on the Challenge Tour in Europe. He won his first title in September at the Challenge de Catalunya.

In 2013, he had his second victory on the Challenge Tour, winning the 2013 Montecchia Golf Open. He followed this a month later with his third win, the Fred Olsen Challenge de España, where he set the tournament record, 260 (−24), and won by a record 10 strokes.

Three weeks later, he had his third win of the year at the Scottish Hydro Challenge. With those three wins, he earned his European Tour card for the remainder of the 2013 season and for the full 2014 season. The day after his third Challenge Tour win of 2013, Koepka qualified for the 2013 Open Championship. Koepka made his debut as a member of the European Tour (he played in three events prior to promotion to membership) at the Scottish Open, finishing T12.

2014
On the 2014 PGA Tour, Koepka played a few events on sponsor's exemptions and through open qualifying.  In his first event of the year, Koepka led after the second and third rounds of the Frys.com Open.  He finished tied for third. At the U.S. Open, he collected a fourth-place finish, which earned him his first PGA Tour card, for the 2014–15 season, and his first Masters invitation. He was 15th at the PGA Championship, and was nominated for the PGA Tour Rookie of the Year award.

On the 2014 European Tour, Koepka won the Turkish Airlines Open and finished third at the Dubai Desert Classic and Omega European Masters, and ninth at the Alfred Dunhill Links Championship. He ranked 8th in the 2014 Race to Dubai rankings and was named the European Tour's Sir Henry Cotton Rookie of the Year.

2015
On February 1, 2015, Koepka won his first PGA Tour event, the Waste Management Phoenix Open and moved to 19th in the Official World Golf Ranking.

At the 2015 Open Championship, Koepka improved every day and a final round 68 vaulted him into a tie for 10th at the Old Course at St Andrews. The next week, Koepka was tied for fourth after 54 holes at the RBC Canadian Open but a final round 74 pushed him down to a tie for 18th at the Glen Abbey Golf Course. He then tied for 6th at the 2015 WGC-Bridgestone Invitational and tied for 5th at the 2015 PGA Championship. In 2015, he chose to give up his European Tour membership.

2016–2017
Koepka finished tied for 4th at the 2016 PGA Championship. In November 2016, Koepka won the Dunlop Phoenix Tournament in Japan.

In 2017, Koepka won his first major championship by claiming the U.S. Open title at Erin Hills, Wisconsin. His win tied him for the record of the lowest U.S. Open score at 16 under (tied with Rory McIlroy's 2011 record).

2018
Koepka had to undergo wrist surgery after the 2017 season and had hoped that his recuperation would be complete in time for the 2018 Masters Tournament but he had to withdraw, saying that he was only 80% fit. He recovered to successfully defend his U.S. Open title at Shinnecock Hills, becoming the first player since Curtis Strange in 1989 to win consecutive U.S. Open titles, which has occurred only seven times. He won his third major at the 2018 PGA Championship at Bellerive Country Club to become only the fifth player, and the first since Tiger Woods in 2000, to win the U.S. Open and the PGA titles in the same year.

At the 2018 Ryder Cup, an errant tee shot by Koepka struck a female spectator and caused a globe rupture of her right eye resulting in her losing vision in that eye. Also at the Ryder Cup, it was rumored that Koepka and teammate Dustin Johnson got into a feud over some personal issues but Koepka denied these claims saying, "This Dustin thing I don't get, there is no fight, no argument, he's one of my best friends. People like to make a story and run with it. It's not the first time there's been a news story that isn't true that has gone out."

On October 21, 2018, Koepka won the CJ Cup, and the win moved him to number one in the Official World Golf Ranking.

2019

On May 19, 2019, Koepka won the 2019 PGA Championship, the first to successfully defend the PGA Championship since Tiger Woods in 2007. With his win in this major championship, Koepka regained the #1 position in the Official World Golf Ranking. 			

Through the 2019 season, Koepka has made the cut in 92% of the major championships he's entered (22 out of 24).

On July 28, 2019, Koepka won the WGC-FedEx St. Jude Invitational. By doing so, he won $1,745,000 and clinched the season-long Wyndham Rewards Top 10 Challenge and an additional $2,000,000.

On August 4, 2019, Koepka clinched the season-long Aon Risk Reward Challenge and another $1,000,000 for the 2018–19 season. This challenge selects one hole in every participating event and designates it as the Aon Risk Reward hole for that week. The challenge rewards the player who has the best two scores from every participating event that a player competes in throughout the season, measured by the lowest average score to par on these holes.

Koepka won the PGA of America Player of the Year award for the second consecutive year.

Koepka qualified for the 2019 Presidents Cup but withdrew because of a knee injury and was replaced by Rickie Fowler on November 20, 2019.

His caddie since 2013 is Ricky Elliott.

2020–2021 
Koepka was plagued by hip and knee pains for the majority of the season and, in August 2020, withdrew from competition prior to the FedEx Cup playoffs.

In February 2021, Koepka won the Waste Management Phoenix Open at TPC Scottsdale in Arizona. Koepka overcame a five-shot deficit on the final day, with a 6-under-par 65. This was his second win at the event. Koepka underwent knee surgery on March 16, 2021.

In May 2021, Koepka finished in a tie for second place at the 2021 PGA Championship. A final round 74 saw him finish two shots behind Phil Mickelson; who became the oldest major champion at the age of 50.

In September 2021, Koepka played on the U.S. team in the 2021 Ryder Cup at Whistling Straits in Kohler, Wisconsin. The U.S. team won 19–9 and Koepka went 2–2–0 including a win in his Sunday singles match against Bernd Wiesberger.

Koepka won The Match on November 26 against rival Bryson DeChambeau at the Wynn Las Vegas.

2022: Joined LIV Golf
In June 2022, Koepka joined the LIV Golf Invitational Series and made his debut in Portland. He made his decision despite suggesting four months prior that golfers would "sell out" and join LIV Golf. Koepka was subsequently suspended by the PGA Tour for playing in the LIV Golf Invitational Series.

In October 2022, Koepka won the LIV Golf Invitational Jeddah in a playoff over Peter Uihlein for his first LIV Golf win.

Personal life
Koepka's younger brother, Chase, is also a professional golfer. The two brothers played as partners in the 2019 Zurich Classic of New Orleans on the  PGA Tour, the only Tour event using a team format.

His great uncle is Major League Baseball player Dick Groat.

On April 1, 2021, Koepka announced his engagement to actress Jena Sims. They were married on June 4, 2022 in the Turks and Caicos.

Koepka appears in the sports documentary series Full Swing, which premiered on Netflix on February 15, 2023.

Amateur wins
2009 Rice Planters Amateur
2011 Brickyard Collegiate
2012 Seminole Intercollegiate, Florida Atlantic Intercollegiate

Professional wins (16)

PGA Tour wins (8)

PGA Tour playoff record (0–1)

European Tour wins (6)

Japan Golf Tour wins (2)

Challenge Tour wins (4)

*Note: The 2012 Challenge de Catalunya was shortened to 54 holes due to rain.

LIV Golf Invitational Series wins (1)

1Co-sanctioned by the MENA Tour

LIV Golf Invitational Series playoff record (1–0)

Major championships

Wins (4)

Results timeline
Results not in chronological order in 2020.

CUT = missed the half-way cut
"T" indicates a tie for a place
NT = No tournament due to COVID-19 pandemic

Summary

Most consecutive cuts made – 24 (2013 PGA – 2020 Masters)
Longest streak of top-10s – 5 (2018 PGA – 2019 Open)

Results in The Players Championship

CUT = missed the half-way cut
"T" indicates a tie for a place
C = Canceled after the first round due to the COVID-19 pandemic

World Golf Championships

Wins (1)

Results timeline

1Cancelled due to COVID-19 pandemic

QF, R16, R32, R64 = Round in which player lost in match play
WD = Withdrew
NT = No tournament
"T" = Tied
Note that the Championship and Invitational were discontinued from 2022.

U.S. national team appearances
Professional
Ryder Cup: 2016 (winners), 2018, 2021 (winners)
Presidents Cup: 2017 (winners)

See also
2013 Challenge Tour graduates
List of Florida State Seminoles men's golfers
List of golfers with most Challenge Tour wins
List of golfers to achieve a three-win promotion from the Challenge Tour
List of men's major championships winning golfers
List of World Number One male golfers

References

External links

American male golfers
Florida State Seminoles men's golfers
European Tour golfers
PGA Tour golfers
LIV Golf players
Winners of men's major golf championships
Ryder Cup competitors for the United States
Golfers from Florida
Sportspeople from West Palm Beach, Florida
People from Jupiter, Florida
1990 births
Living people